Syria competed at the 1992 Summer Olympics in Barcelona, Spain.

Competitors
The following is the list of number of competitors in the Games.

Athletics

Men
Track events

Women
Combined events – Heptathlon

Shooting 

Open

Swimming

Men

Wrestling

Men's freestyle

Men's Greco-Roman

References

Official Olympic Reports

Nations at the 1992 Summer Olympics
1992
Olympics, Summer